David Edward 'Davey' Boyd (16 August 1927 – 15 December 2017) was an Australian rules footballer who played with Port Adelaide in the South Australian National Football League (SANFL).

Port Adelaide 
Boyd was a key member of the strong Port Adelaide side of the 1950s, playing in seven premiership sides.

He made his debut in 1948 and although he started as a forward he soon developed into a centreman, the position that he would play the majority of his career in. He was a Magarey Medallist in 1956 and a regular interstate representative for South Australia, appearing in three carnivals. He finished his career in 1960 after playing a total of 222 games for Port Adelaide.

Personal life 
Boyd's sons Greg and Russell also played for Port Adelaide.

Honours 
He is a half forward flanker in Port Adelaide's official 'Greatest Team' from 1870 to 2000.

References

External links

Port Adelaide Football Club (SANFL) players
Port Adelaide Football Club players (all competitions)
Magarey Medal winners
Australian rules footballers from South Australia
South Australian Football Hall of Fame inductees
1927 births
2017 deaths
Place of birth missing